Erich Ludwig (1 May 1879 – 14 May 1934) was a German rugby union player who competed in the 1900 Summer Olympics.

He was a member of the German rugby union team, which won the silver medal. Germany was represented at the tournament by the FC 1880 Frankfurt rather than an official national team.

He is the brother of Richard Ludwig, who also played at the 1900 tournament.

References

External links

 

Year of birth missing
Year of death missing
German rugby union players
Rugby union players at the 1900 Summer Olympics
Olympic rugby union players of Germany
Olympic silver medalists for Germany
SC 1880 Frankfurt players
Rugby union wings
1879 births
1934 deaths